is a one-shot gekiga written and illustrated by essayist and mangaka Yoshiharu Tsuge. Screw Style follows of the story of an unnamed boy who goes around several places in war-torn Japan in order to find a doctor who can fix his pierced artery.

The manga was first published in the manga anthology magazine Garo in 1968 to popularity among Japanese youth. The manga has been adapted into a video game and a live action film.

Plot 
A boy arriving ashore in war-torn Japan is bitten by a jellyfish that pierces his artery. He enters a nearby village and goes around looking for a doctor, but finds none. The boy then proceeds to follow a road of railway tracks in hope that it will lead him to the next village, only to get onto a train that brings him back to the village he first entered.

He then decides to search the village again, this time properly and encounters an old woman who tells him that the doctor he desires is in a nearby factory, but the boy goes to a female gynecologist who resides in a bunker instead. He has sex with the gynecologist before getting his pierced artery fixed with a safety valve and wrench. The manga ends with the boy sailing away in a motorboat.

Style and themes 
Screw Style does not have a conventional plot, and like many of Tsuge's works for Garo, it has a surreal, ambiguous quality in the progress of the narrative and the artwork. All characters except the main character are drawn as if they are static.

There have been various interpretations of the themes of the manga, with various critics arguing the manga is about birth and death, or existential nihilism.

Release 
It was published in the June 1968 issue of Garo magazine and gained cult status among Japanese youth at the time. It was subsequently translated into English by Bill Randall for the American magazine The Comics Journal for its February 2003 issue. In May 2022, Drawn & Quarterly announced that they licensed the manga for English publication.

Adaptations 
The manga was adapted into a game for the Japanese PC-9800 and Sharp X68000 platforms in 1989. In 1998 Japanese film director Teruo Ishii adapted the manga into a live-action film (also known as Wind-Up Type) starring Tadanobu Asano and Miki Fujitani.

References

External links 
 
 
 The Stopcock scanlation in Concerned Theatre Japan at Center for Japanese Studies Publications

1968 manga
One-shot manga
1989 video games
Japan-exclusive video games
1998 films
Japanese drama films
1990s Japanese-language films
Live-action films based on manga
NEC PC-9801 games
Seinen manga
X68000 games
Video games developed in Japan
Gekiga
Drawn & Quarterly titles